The Ransom Gillis House is a historic home located at 205 Alfred Street (formerly 63 Alfred prior to renumbering) in Midtown Detroit, Michigan, within the Brush Park district. It was designed by Henry T. Brush and George D. Mason and built between 1876 and 1878. The structure, unoccupied since the mid-1960s, was "mothballed" by the City of Detroit in 2005–2006, in hopes of restoration in the future. On November 1, 2015, the completely refurbished home opened its doors to the public after a thorough renovation in a joint project between HGTV, Rehab Addict's Nicole Curtis, and Detroit-based mortgage lender Quicken Loans. The project resulted in an eight-part special that aired on HGTV.

History
The Ransom Gillis House was built at a cost of $12,000 for Ransom Gillis, a wholesale dry goods merchant. The property was sold by Gillis in 1880. The house and property passed through the hands of four different upper-income families between 1880 and 1919. After this time, the main structure was converted into a rooming house, along with most of the other structures on the street. The carriage house behind the structure was rented by Mary Chase Perry Stratton in 1903, becoming the first home of Pewabic Pottery. The pottery moved in 1906, and the carriage house was then occupied by an auto repair shop, a battery service shop, and finally a filling station, before being torn down and replaced by a restaurant in 1935. The restaurant operated until the 1960s and was demolished in 2005–2006, as part of the city's "mothballing" work on the property.

A storefront was added to the front of the Ransom Gillis House in the late 1930s and was operated along with the rooming house until the mid-1960s. Various attempts were made to restore the main structure in the 1970s, 1980s, and mid-2000s, none of which succeeded.

The property was owned by the City of Detroit as of 2001.

Architecture
The Ransom Gillis House brought to Detroit the Venetian Gothic style, made popular by John Ruskin's book The Stones of Venice. The centerpiece of the structure is the turret situated in the front left corner, the circumference of which is accented by five rows of tiles of simple geometric designs in hues of bright blue, red, yellow, and brown. Similar tile work was spread throughout the rest of the structure. The base of the turret is decorated with stone carvings of quadruplets of flower blossoms, similar but all slightly different. The turret was supported from below by an ornate stone post. Dark ornately carved wood columns enclosed the porch at the entrance to the house. Lastly, a steep, dark slate mansard roof with ornate iron cresting completed the peaks in a traditional detail of the day.

Restoration
On March 25, 2015, the Detroit Free Press announced that Nicole Curtis would be restoring the home on her TV series, Rehab Addict. Curtis spoke of the project saying "The energy here [Detroit] is unreal and it's unmatched anywhere else. For doing what I do, to be in a city that's excited for us to be here and not fighting us? It's a huge thing." Work on the house began in the summer of 2015. Curtis led the renovation of the 1876-built mansion for an eight-part HGTV series sponsored by Quicken Loans, the mortgage lender founded by local billionaire Dan Gilbert. The series originally aired in November 2015.

Gillis' life and work

Ransom Gillis was born December 20, 1838, in Washington County, New York to Alexander Ransom and Jane (Wilson). One of eight children, Ransom attended public schools and the Argyle Academy. He relocated to Detroit in 1864 and found work at the Allen-Sheldon Dry Goods Company. He worked there until 1872 when he founded Edson, Moore & Company with colleagues James L. Edson and George F. Moore. Gillis operated as the "buyer of the house". Edson, Moore & Company ultimately grew to span 194 through 204 Jefferson Avenue with an area of 125 x 120 feet. They featured wholesale dry goods such as Irish and Scottish linens, hosiery and gloves from Saxony, goods from Europe and from American mills. In December 1893, the massive store on Jefferson was gutted by a fire that was estimated at doing $750,000 in damage. Seven employees died in the fire, including two who were forced to jump from the fifth floor of the burning building. In November 1913, the firm relocated to a storefront at 494-514 Fort Street in Detroit. They advertised the new location as being at the north-east corner of Fort Street and M.C.R.R. (Michigan Central Rail Road).

Gillis married Helen A. Gaylord in 1870 and together they had three children: Ransom Fay, Gaylord Wilson, and Grace M.

Ransom Fay was born on November 3, 1871. He attended Yale University in 1894 and 1895.

Grace M. married David S. Carter and died in 1901.

Gaylord, was born July 1, 1873, attended the University of Michigan and succeeded his father in the dry good business, working for Edson, Moore & Company.

Gillis was a member of many key institutions in Detroit, including the Old Michigan Club, First Presbyterian Church, a board member of Grace Hospital and Lake St. Clair Fishing and Shooting Club. Ransom Gillis died on 31 December 1901 from pneumonia.

Gallery

References

External links
63 Alfred Street: Where Capitalism Failed
Riverfront View of Edson, Moore & Co. color
photograph of Edson, Moore & Co.
photograph of employees of Edson, Moore & Co.

Houses in Detroit
Houses completed in 1876
Historic district contributing properties in Michigan
National Register of Historic Places in Detroit
Houses on the National Register of Historic Places in Michigan
1876 establishments in Michigan
Gilded Age mansions